Jiří Kodl (3 April 1889 – 29 October 1955) was a Czech tennis player. He competed for Bohemia in the men's outdoor singles event at the 1912 Summer Olympics. He was the flag bearer for Bohemia at the 1912 Games.

References

1889 births
1955 deaths
Czechoslovak male tennis players
Olympic tennis players of Bohemia
Tennis players at the 1912 Summer Olympics
Sportspeople from Písek